Raúl Navarro may refer to:

 Raúl Navarro (baseball) (1921-1999), Cuban baseball outfielder
 Raúl Navarro (footballer) (born 1994), Spanish football right-back